Margaret Craig McNamara (August 22, 1915 – February 3, 1981) was the founder of the nonprofit children's literacy organization Reading is Fundamental and the wife of the United States Secretary of Defense Robert McNamara.

Life and work
McNamara was born on August 22, 1915 in Spokane, Washington, and grew up in Alameda, California.

McNamara attended University of California, Berkeley, where she met Robert McNamara, whom she would marry on August 13, 1940. Her husband's appointment by President John F. Kennedy as U.S. Secretary of Defense led to their move to Washington, D.C. Her experiences while tutoring three children in the District led to the formation of Reading Is Fundamental (RIF), a nonprofit children's literacy organization dedicated to making reading a fun and beneficial part of everyday life. It is the largest literacy program in the country.

On January 16, 1981, President Jimmy Carter awarded McNamara the Medal of Freedom for her work with RIF. She died of cancer eighteen days later, at the age of 65. In summer of 1981, her ashes were scattered by her family on a mountainside meadow at Buckskin Pass, near Snowmass Village, Colorado. Margaret Craig McNamara is commemorated on her husband's grave marker in Arlington National Cemetery.

Legacy

Reading is Fundamental

After many early organizational meeting with other educators in the District, McNamara secured a $150,000 grant from the Ford Foundation to support pilot activities in the District of Columbia. Following the success RIF had in Washington, the Ford Foundation increased RIF's grant to $285,000 in August 1968, enabling RIF to launch ten model programs across the country. From these early beginnings, RIF evolved into a national motivating force for literacy. At the time of McNamara's death in 1981, RIF had provided "more than 3 million poor children with 37 million books."

Today, through its contract with the U.S. Department of Education and with private funds, RIF provides 16 million free books for children to choose and keep each year. RIF programs operate in all 50 states, the District of Columbia, Puerto Rico, the U.S. Virgin Islands, and Guam. RIF is also affiliated with programs in Argentina and the United Kingdom. It achieves high visibility through public service announcements on children's television programs.

Margaret McNamara Education Grants
The Margaret McNamara Memorial Fund was established in 1981 to honor Margaret McNamara and her commitment to the well-being of women and children in developing countries. Grants are provided annually to support the university education of women from developing countries who are committed to improving the lives of women and children. Grant recipients study in diverse fields, such as agriculture, architecture and urban planning, civil engineering, education, forestry, journalism, nursing, nutrition, pediatrics, public administration, public health, social sciences, and social work.

In 2015, the volunteer non-profit organization was rebranded as Margaret McNamara Education Grants. Grants are awarded to women studying at accredited universities in the USA, Canada, select universities in Latin America and in South Africa. As of December 2020, grants have been awarded to 450 extraordinary women from more than 75 countries.

References

External links
 Margaret McNamara Education Grants website
 Reading is Fundamental website
 McNamara Biography on Reading is Fundamental website
 Congress: Don't Close the Book on RIF, a June 3, 2008, article from The Huffington Post.

1915 births
1981 deaths
Grants (money)
Reading skill advocates
Burials at Arlington National Cemetery
University of California, Berkeley alumni
Presidential Medal of Freedom recipients
Deaths from cancer in Washington, D.C.
Place of birth missing
People from Spokane, Washington